Madison Brengle was the defending champion but lost in the final to Taylor Townsend, 0–6 4–6.

Seeds

Draw

Finals

Top half

Bottom half

References
Main Draw

LTP Charleston Pro Tennis - Singles